This is a list of notable events in country music that took place in the year 2000.

Events
 March 4 — "Amazed" by Lonestar becomes the first country song to have topped both the Billboard Hot Country Singles & Tracks and the Billboard Hot 100 chart since the Kenny Rogers-Dolly Parton duet, "Islands In The Stream" in October 1983. The country-leaning "Amazed" — which had a brief run in the Hot 100 during the summer of 1999 — had been remixed for Top 40 radio, launching it to its run of pop-radio success.
 March 7 - George Strait and Alan Jackson release "Murder on Music Row". While the song is not officially released as a single, the song stirs up controversy for its lyrics of how country pop is taking over traditional country music.
 March 10 — Vince Gill and Christian singer Amy Grant are married.
 May 13 - Kenny Rogers makes chart history as "Buy Me a Rose" hits #1 on the Hot Country Songs chart, making it not only his first #1 since his 1987 duet with Ronnie Milsap, "Make No Mistake, She's Mine", but also the oldest singer to have a #1 single until 2003 (Rogers was 61 at the time). The song is also the only #1 for Alison Krauss and Billy Dean, who are credited as guest vocalists.
 October 26 - Garth Brooks announces his retirement from touring during a party to celebrate his certification for sales of 100 million albums, at Nashville's Gaylord Entertainment Center.
 December – RFD-TV, a cable network devoted to rural Americans culture, is launched. In addition to agriculture- and farming-centric shows, a large programming block is devoted to classic country music television shows.

Top hits of the year

Singles released by American artists

Singles released by Canadian artists

Top new album releases

Other top albums

Births
 January 27 — Bailey Zimmerman, up-and-coming singer of the 2020s ("Fall in Love", "Rock and a Hard Place")
 March 5 — Gabby Barrett, rose to fame as third-place contestant in sixteenth season of American Idol, singer-songwriter of the 2020s ("I Hope", "The Good Ones")
 October 6 — Jackson Dean, up-and-coming country singer of the 2020s ("Don't Come Lookin'")

Deaths
 March 7 — Pee Wee King, 86, singer-songwriter (heart attack)
 March 14 — Tommy Collins, 69, singer and songwriter who helped create the Bakersfield Sound
 March 19 — Speck Rhodes, 84, comedian and musician best known for his work on The Porter Wagoner Show. 
 April 21 — Neal Matthews, Jr., 70, member of The Jordanaires (heart attack)
 November 5 — Jimmie Davis, 101, the "Singing Governor", two-term governor of Louisiana from 1944 to 1948 and again from 1960 to 1964 (natural causes)

Hall of Fame inductees

Bluegrass Music Hall of Fame inductees
 Lance LeRoy
 Doc Watson

Country Music Hall of Fame inductees
 Charley Pride (1934-2020)
 Faron Young (1932–1996)

Canadian Country Music Hall of Fame inductees
 Colleen Peterson
 Leonard Rambeau

Major awards

Grammy Awards
 Best Female Country Vocal Performance — "Breathe", Faith Hill
 Best Male Country Vocal Performance — "Solitary Man", Johnny Cash
 Best Country Performance by a Duo or Group with Vocal — "Cherokee Maiden",  Asleep at the Wheel
 Best Country Collaboration with Vocals — "Let's Make Love", Faith Hill and Tim McGraw
 Best Country Instrumental Performance — "Leaving Cottondale", Alison Brown and Béla Fleck
 Best Country Song — "I Hope You Dance", Mark D. Sanders and Tia Sillers
 Best Country Album — Breathe, Faith Hill
 Best Bluegrass Album — The Grass Is Blue, Dolly Parton

Juno Awards
 Best Country Male Artist — Paul Brandt
 Best Country Female Artist — Terri Clark
 Best Country Group or Duo — The Wilkinsons

Academy of Country Music
 Entertainer of the Year — Dixie Chicks
 Song of the Year — "I Hope You Dance", Mark D. Sanders, Tia Sillers
 Single of the Year — "I Hope You Dance", Lee Ann Womack
 Album of the Year — How Do You Like Me Now?!, Toby Keith
 Top Male Vocalist — Toby Keith
 Top Female Vocalist — Faith Hill
 Top Vocal Duo — Brooks & Dunn
 Top Vocal Group — Dixie Chicks
 Top New Male Vocalist — Keith Urban
 Top New Female Vocalist — Jamie O'Neal
 Top New Vocal Duo or Group — Rascal Flatts
 Video of the Year — "Goodbye Earl", Dixie Chicks (Director: Evan Bernard)
 Vocal Event of the Year — "I Hope You Dance", Lee Ann Womack and Sons Of The Desert

ARIA Awards 
(presented in Sydney on October 24, 2000)
Best Country Album - Big River (Troy Cassar-Daley)

Canadian Country Music Association
 Chevy Fans' Choice Award — The Wilkinsons
 Male Artist of the Year — Paul Brandt
 Female Artist of the Year — Michelle Wright
 Group or Duo of the Year — The Wilkinsons
 SOCAN Song of the Year — "Daddy Won't Sell the Farm", Steve Fox, Robin Branda
 Single of the Year — "Jimmy's Got a Girlfriend", The Wilkinsons
 Album of the Year — Here and Now, The Wilkinsons
 Top Selling Album — Fly, Dixie Chicks
 Video of the Year — "That's the Truth", Paul Brandt
 FACTOR Rising Star Award — Tara Lyn Hart
 Vocal/Instrumental Collaboration of the Year — "Get Me Through December", Natalie MacMaster and Alison Krauss

Country Music Association
 Entertainer of the Year — Dixie Chicks
 Song of the Year — "I Hope You Dance", Mark D. Sanders, Tia Sillers
 Single of the Year — "I Hope You Dance," Lee Ann Womack
 Album of the Year — Fly, Dixie Chicks
 Male Vocalist of the Year — Tim McGraw
 Female Vocalist of the Year — Faith Hill
 Vocal Duo of the Year — Montgomery Gentry
 Vocal Group of the Year — Dixie Chicks
 Horizon Award — Brad Paisley
 Music Video of the Year — "Goodbye Earl", Dixie Chicks (Director: Evan Bernard)
 Vocal Event of the Year — "Murder on Music Row", George Strait and Alan Jackson
 Musician of the Year — Hargus "Pig" Robbins

Further reading
 Whitburn, Joel, "Top Country Songs 1944–2005 – 6th Edition." 2005.

Other links
 Country Music Association
 Inductees of the Country Music Hall of Fame

External links
 Country Music Hall of Fame

Country
Country music by year